{{Infobox cricket team
| name             = Windward Islands
| image            = 
| alt              = 
| caption          = 

| captain          = Afy Fletcher
| coach            = Samantha Lynch
| colours          =  Green

| founded          = First recorded match: 2016
| ground           =

| title1           = S50
| title1wins       = 0
| title2           = T20 Blaze
| title2wins       = 0

| website          =
}}

The Windward Islands women's cricket team is the women's cricket team representing the member countries of the Windward Islands Cricket Board of Control: Dominica, Grenada, Saint Lucia and Saint Vincent and the Grenadines. They compete in the Women's Super50 Cup and the Twenty20 Blaze.

Until 2014, the countries that make up the Windward Islands competed separately in the two competitions. In 2015, two teams named South Windward Islands and North Windward Islands competed before the current team began playing in 2016.

History
The Windward Islands joined the West Indies domestic structure in 2016, playing in the Regional Women's Championship and the Regional Women's Twenty20 Championship. They finished fifth out of six in the 50-over competition and fourth in the T20 competition. 

Prior to this, the countries that now make up the Windward Islands team had competed separately, with Grenada joining the domestic structure for its inaugural season in 1975–76, Saint Lucia joining in 1988, Dominica in 1995 and Saint Vincent and the Grenadines in 2000. St Lucia won two 50-over titles, and Grenada and St Vincent won one apiece. The four individual teams competed in their final season in 2014, and in 2015 were replaced in the 50-over competition by South Windward Islands and North Windward Islands. The South team finished 4th out of 6 with two wins, whilst the North team finished bottom with no victories.

Since 2016, the now-unified Windward Islands team have competed in every edition of both the 50-over and T20 competitions. They achieved their best finish in the 50-over competition in the 2016–17 season, finishing 3rd with 3 wins. In the most recent domestic season, 2022, the side finished 5th in both competitions.

Players
Current squad
Based on squad announced for the 2022 season. Players in bold have international caps.

Notable players
Players who have played for the Windward Islands and played internationally are listed below, in order of first international appearance (given in brackets):

 Juliana Nero (2003)
 Cordel Jack (2005)
 Afy Fletcher (2008)
 Pearl Etienne (2010)
 Qiana Joseph (2017)
 Akeira Peters (2017)
 Zaida James (2023)
 Jannillea Glasgow (2023)

Honours
 Women's Super50 Cup:
 Winners (0):
 Best finish: 3rd (2016–17)
 Twenty20 Blaze:
 Winners (0): 
 Best finish:'' 4th (2016)

See also
 Windward Islands cricket team
 Dominica women's national cricket team
 Grenada women's national cricket team
 Saint Lucia women's national cricket team
 Saint Vincent and the Grenadines women's national cricket team

References

Women's cricket in Dominica
Women's cricket in Grenada
Women's cricket in Saint Lucia
Women's cricket in Saint Vincent and the Grenadines
Women's cricket in the Windward Islands
Women's cricket teams in the West Indies